Oulanka National Park is a national park in the Northern Ostrobothnia and Lapland regions of Finland, covering . The park was established in 1956 and was expanded in 1982 and 1989. It borders the Paanajärvi National Park in Russia. The first inhabitants in the area were Sami people from Lapland who lived here until the end of the 17th century, which was when they had to give way to Finnish settlers. Although hunting, fishing and later farming was the primary occupation of the people who lived there, today the most notable activity in Oulanka is tourism. From the 1930s, the Finnish Tourist Association kept boats on the river and renovated the wooden cabins found across the park for accommodation purposes. These cabins can be used free of charge by any hikers in the area, given that they follow some basic guidelines and rules regarding the state of the cabins, the wood supply, and protecting the surrounding nature.

From 2002, Oulanka was the first of the two Finnish national parks which became part of World Wide Fund for Nature's PAN Parks, the other one being the Southwestern Archipelago National Park.

Nature
Oulanka National Park is a unique and versatile combination of northern, southern and eastern nature. The landscape is made up of pine forests, river valleys with sandy banks and rapids, and in the north of vast mires. It has a unique river ecosystem and is an example of untouched and unlogged boreal forest, close to the arctic circle, which is protected by World Wide Fund for Nature from intensive reindeer herding. The area is rich in animal and plant species, even endangered ones. Near the visitor's center is the Oulanka Research Center, which is part of the Thule Institute and was established in 1966 to facilitate research in biological and geological sciences. The research center also offers its facilities to visiting tourists or hikers, during the less busy seasons.

Along with the rugged geography and the varied microclimates, the location of the park is also one of the main reasons for the great variety of plants and trees, with more than 500 vascular plant species in the area. There is an overlap between northern and southern species in terms of their distribution, and numerous species in the east of Finland have their westernmost outposts here. Oulanka has a nutrient-rich soil, which makes it ideal for the rare and demanding flora that is found here. The Oulanka River Valley was a very important dispersal route for various species coming from eastern Finland, after the last ice age. In late summer, the park is abound with bilberries and mushrooms, and wild orchids are one of the most popular flowers in the area.

Riverbeds and alluvial meadows are home to rare species of butterflies, and more than a hundred different bird species have their home in the park. Most meadows are managed in a traditional manner, and reindeer herding continues to thrive within the park, although it is restricted to people from Lapland. In the park there are also rare birds such as the Siberian jay and capercaillies, which are fond of the herb-rich forests in the park. Endangered species such as bear, lynx and wolverine also find their home in Oulanka, along with moose and other game.

Hiking
Oulanka is one of the most popular national parks in Finland. The most well-known Finnish trekking route, Karhunkierros (80 km), is located in the national park, and is accessible all year round. Other routes include the Pieni Karhunkierros Trail (12 km), Keroharju Hiking Trail (17 km) and other smaller nature trails such as the Rytisuo Nature Trail (5 km), Hiidenlampi Nature Trail (5 km), and the Kiutaköngäs Day-trip Trail (8 km). There are various camping areas, designated fireplaces, wooden cabins and boats which are available to the public. There are also some winter trails, which include the Rytisuo Snowshoeing Trail (7.5 km) or the Oulanka Wilderness Trail, from Juuma to Kiutaköngäs (26 km) which can be also explored with skis, snowshoes or even snowmobiles. Other activities include canoeing or cycling through some routes. Visitors are allowed to pick berries and mushrooms, but are not allowed to hunt game or fish without a license.

See also
List of national parks of Finland
Protected areas of Finland
PAN Parks
Maanselka

References

External links

Outdoors.fi – Oulanka National Park
PAN Parks - Oulanka National Park
National Geographic Magazine 6/2009

Kuusamo
Salla
Geography of North Ostrobothnia
Tourist attractions in North Ostrobothnia
Geography of Lapland (Finland)
Tourist attractions in Lapland (Finland)
Protected areas established in 1956
Ramsar sites in Finland
National parks of Finland